Joseph Esherick (December 28, 1914 – December 17, 1998) was an American architect.

Architectural career
Joseph Esherick was born in  Philadelphia, Pennsylvania. He graduated from the University of Pennsylvania in 1937 with a bachelor's degree in architecture. Esherick worked for San Francisco Bay Area architect Gardner Dailey, and, about 1950, began his own practice in the Bay Area. He taught at the University of California, Berkeley for many years. Esherick was awarded the AIA Gold Medal in 1989.

Following in the tradition of Bay Area architects such as Bernard Maybeck and William Wurster, Esherick designed hundreds of houses, emphasizing regional traditions, site requirements, and user needs.

In 1938, Esherick married Rebecca Wood whom he knew from Penn. About ten years later Rebecca designed their own home in Kent Woodlands with Joe consulting. The style of the house with a huge gabled roof and large glass walls is stunningly modern. In 1946, Rebecca earned her architectural license and worked for her husband on a variety of projects while raising their three children.

In 1959, Esherick was the co-founder, along with William Wurster and Vernon DeMars, of Berkeley's influential College of Environmental Design (CED). The CED encompassed disciplines of architecture, landscape architecture, environmental planning and city planning, and served as a nexus for figures like Christopher Alexander, Catherine Bauer, Galen Cranz, Donlyn Lyndon, Roger Montgomery, Charles Moore, and William Wilson Wurster.

In 1972, Esherick reorganized his office, turning away from houses to more commercial and academic work, with three longtime associates George Homsey, Peter Dodge and Chuck Davis to form Esherick Homsey Dodge & Davis, the winner of the 1986 Architecture Firm Award.  The firm continues today as EHDD Architecture. In 1976, Esherick was elected into the National Academy of Design as an Associate member, and became a full Academician in 1990.

Esherick was the nephew of American sculptor Wharton Esherick.

Work (partial list)
 Hubbard House, Dover, Massachusetts, 1957
 House at Kentwoodlands, Kent Woodlands, California, 1957
 Hubbard at end of Spring Road, Ross, CA, April 5, 1959
 Cary House, Mill Valley, California, 1960
 Harold E. Jones Child Study Center, at University of California, Berkeley, 1960
 Bermak House, Oakland, California, 1963, with architect Peter Dodge
 Six Sea Ranch Demonstration Houses (now called The Hedgerow Homes)  (in collaboration with landscape architect Lawrence Halprin, three small scale Demonstration houses called Mini-Mods, as well as other private residences at The Sea Ranch Sonoma County, California, 1967
 The Cannery, San Francisco, California, 1968
 Mountain House (aka Roscoe House) Alamo, California, 1972
 Garfield School, San Francisco, California, 1981
 Flora Lamson Hewlett Library, Graduate Theological Union, Berkeley, 1981
 Silver Lake Lodge, Deer Valley, Utah, 1982
 Monterey Bay Aquarium, Monterey, California, 1984
 Hermitage Condominiums, San Francisco, California, 1984
 McGuire house, 268 Seadrift Road, Stinson Beach, California, 1987
 Henry's Fork Lodge, Island Park, Idaho, 1991
 Aquarium of the Pacific, Long Beach, California, 1998
 Tenderloin Community School, 1999

Notes

References
Joseph Esherick. An architectural practice in the San Francisco Bay Area, 1938-1996 : oral history transcript / 1996
A Bay Region master: The architecture of Joseph Esherick finally gets its due

External links
 
 Finding aid to the Joseph Esherick Collection at the Environmental Design Archives, University of California, Berkeley
 https://www.nytimes.com/1998/12/25/arts/joseph-esherick-83-an-acclaimed-architect.html

1914 births
1998 deaths
20th-century American architects
University of Pennsylvania School of Design alumni
UC Berkeley College of Environmental Design faculty
People from the San Francisco Bay Area
Architecture in the San Francisco Bay Area
Architects from Philadelphia
Recipients of the AIA Gold Medal